Hugh George Egioke Savage (1883 – 7 February 1957)) was an English-born journalist and political figure in British Columbia. He represented Cowichan-Newcastle in the Legislative Assembly of British Columbia from 1933 to 1937 as a member of the Oxford Group Movement.

Background
Savage was born in Stratford-on-Avon and served in South Africa during the Second Boer War. He went to Canada in 1909 and was employed by the Vancouver Daily Province from 1910 to 1911. In January 1914, he was telegrammed by his former roommate and Province coworker Lukin Johnston asking him to take over Johnston's role as editor of the weekly Cowichan Leader, based in Duncan on Vancouver Island.

Savage represented Cowichan-Newcastle in the Legislative Assembly of British Columbia from 1933 to 1937 as a member of the Oxford Group Movement. He was defeated when he ran for re-election to the provincial assembly in 1937 as an Independent. He died in Cobble Hill at the age of 74.

An award for small circulation weekly newspapers, the Hugh Savage Shield, was named in his honour.

References 

1883 births
1957 deaths
Members of the Legislative Assembly of British Columbia
Canadian newspaper editors
Canadian male journalists
The Province newspaper people
British emigrants to Canada